The RGS-50M is a smoothbore single-shot break-action Russian  grenade launcher manufactured by Degtyarev Plant.

It is mainly intended for less than lethal (riot gun) and door breaching law enforcement roles, but it is also capable of firing lethal projectiles.

Description
The RGS-50M is a smoothbore single-shot break-action Russian  grenade launcher manufactured by Degtyarev Plant. It is mainly intended for less than lethal (riot gun) and door breaching law enforcement roles, but it is also capable of firing lethal projectiles.

Ammunition
Rubber baton, rubber buckshot, teargas grenade, FRAG grenade, Smoke grenade:
 GS-50 tear gas
 GSZ-50 flashbang
 EG-50 shock-effect rubber baton round
 EG-50M shock-effect rubber pellets buckshot
 GO-50 lethal fragmentation grenade
 GK-50 lethal shaped-charge grenade
 GV-50 door-buster
 GD-50 instantaneous smoke screen
 BK-50 glass-breaking
 GS-50M improved tear gas grenade
 GS-50PM training grenade

History
The development of the RGS-50M started in the mid-1980s with the first few production models made in the late 1980s, back then known as the RGS-50. In the 1990s, the development of the RGS-50M started with a folding foregrip installed.

Variants

RGS-50 - Original version
RGS-50M - Upgraded version with improved trigger, stock and recoil buffer

Users

Current
 : Known to be ordered in 2014 for Ministry of Interior.

Former
 : RGS-50s bought by the KGB.

See also
 GM-94
 AGS-40 Balkan
 RGM-40 Kastet
 RGSh-30
 DP-64
 DP-65
 MRG-1
 M79 grenade launcher
 M203

References

Grenade launchers of Russia
Riot guns
Riot control weapons
Teargas grenade guns
Degtyarev Plant products